The Harding Bisons are the athletic teams that represent Harding University, located in Searcy, Arkansas, in NCAA Division II intercollegiate sports. The Bisons compete as members of the Great American Conference for all 16 varsity sports. Harding began in the Gulf South Conference in 2000 before moving to the newly formed Great American Conference (GAC) in 2011.

In the GAC's first season, Harding won conference championships in women's cross country and women's golf and placed second in the conference's all-sports trophy standings.

Varsity teams

List of teams

Men's sports
 Baseball
 Basketball
 Cross Country
 Football
 Golf
 Soccer
 Tennis
 Track & Field

Women's sports
 Basketball
 Cross Country
 Golf
 Soccer
 Softball
 Tennis
 Track & Field
 Volleyball

Individual sports

Baseball
Harding's baseball team qualified its first NCAA Tournament in 2011. The Bisons won a school-record 42 games, won the Gulf South Conference West Division, and finished the season ranked 24th in Division II.

Basketball
In his 20th season as head coach of the Harding men's basketball team, Jeff Morgan has led the Bisons to 15 postseason appearances, including three trips to the national tournament. In 2010–11, Morgan led the Bisons to a 25–5 record, a Gulf South Conference Tournament championship, its third berth in the NCAA Tournament, and a No. 11 national ranking.

In February 2013, the Rhodes Field House was named the Best Road Trip Destination in College Basketball by Enterprise Rent-A-Car and GEICO in an online fan poll, receiving more votes than nine Division I institutions, such as Indiana University, the University of Arizona, West Virginia University, and others.

Harding women's basketball has had six straight winning seasons under eighth-year head coach Tim Kirby. In 2011–12, the Lady Bisons advanced to the finals of the GAC Tournament in Bartlesville, Okla.

Bowling
In 1970, the Harding bowling team won the NAIA national championship.

Cross Country
The Bison cross country team, under head coach Steve Guymon, has won 10 conference championships and 10 regional championships during its time in the NCAA. Harding's men have also placed in the top 10 at the national meet seven times.

Harding women's cross country also has 10 conference championships, four regional championships and four top-10 finishes in the national meet since 1997.

Football

The Bison football team, under former coach Ronnie Huckeba, was known for its prolific triple-option rushing attack in recent seasons. In 2011, Harding led Division II with 360.9 rushing yards per game. Coach Huckeba announced his retirement prior to the 2016 season, during which he was named the Don Hansen National Coach of the Year. The Bisons achieved a 13–1 record and finished in the NCAA Division II Quarterfinals. Four players from the 2016 season received All American Honors, and two more received honorable mention. Paul Simmons, former Defensive Coordinator for the Bisons since 2010, was named Head Coach, to begin in the 2017 season, by Athletic Director Greg Harnden.

Softball
Since its inception in the 2013–14 school year, the softball team has been coached by Phil Berry, formerly of the PGA.

Tennis
David Elliott served as the head tennis coach at Harding from 1975 until 2013. During his tenure his men's and women's teams combined for 1,136 victories during his career.  Marco Ruiz, a Harding graduate, former Harding tennis athlete and native of São Paulo, Brazil, replaced Elliott as head tennis coach in 2013.

Volleyball
The Lady Bison volleyball squad has won seven conference championships since 2002 and earned four berths in the NCAA Division II National Tournament. Harding has a 113–12 (.904) winning percentage in conference play in the last 10 seasons.

References

External links
 

 
Bisons
College sports teams in Arkansas
College sports teams in the United States by team